"Salome" is a 1968 Australian TV play starring Frank Thring. It was based on the 1891 play of the same name by Oscar Wilde and was reportedly the first time that play had been adapted for television.

Cast
 Frank Thring as Herod
 Buster Skeggs as Salome
 Freddie Parslow as Jokanaan 
 Monica Maughan as Herodias
 David Foster as a young Syrian

Production
Thring had performed in productions of the play on stage numerous times - indeed it was a performance of Salome in England in 1954 that established his reputation over there. Trevor Ling designed the production from drawings done by Aubrey Beardsley.

The production was announced in July 1967 and taped in December of that year.

Reception
The Sydney Morning Herald said the production "did not make sense" in part because "of sexual passion and conflict there was no trace" saying Thring "was the only player to move and speak with conviction and control."

The Age said "it was more music hall than melodrama" with "Miss Skeggs was splendid" and "Thring's Herod had everything to recommend it."

References

1968 television plays
1968 Australian television episodes
1960s Australian television plays
Wednesday Theatre (season 4) episodes